Neottiura bimaculata is a species of cobweb spider in the family Theridiidae. It is found in North America, Europe, Turkey, Caucasus, Russia (Sibiria), Central Asia, China, and Japan.

Subspecies
These two subspecies belong to the species Neottiura bimaculata:
 (Neottiura bimaculata bimaculata) (Linnaeus, 1767)
 Neottiura bimaculata pellucida (Simon, 1873)

References

External links

 

Theridiidae
Articles created by Qbugbot
Spiders described in 1767
Taxa named by Carl Linnaeus